Zi is the seventh studio album by Negură Bunget, released on September 30, 2016, by Lupus Lounge, a sub-label of Prophecy Productions.

Track listing

Personnel
Negură Bunget
Negru – drums, percussion, dulcimer, tulnic
Ovidiu Corodan – bass
Petrică Ionuţescu – flute, nai, kaval, tulnic
Adi "OQ" Neagoe – guitars, vocals, keyboards
Tibor Kati – vocals, guitars, keyboards, programming

Other staff
Alin Luculescu – mastering
Anita Ramona – design
Daniel Dorobanțu – cover art
Mihai Neagoe – mixing, producer

References

Negură Bunget albums
2016 albums